Bunny and Claude (We Rob Carrot Patches) is a 1968 Warner Bros. Looney Tunes cartoon directed by Robert McKimson. It was the first appearance of Bunny and Claude, inspired by the 1967 Warner Bros. film Bonnie and Clyde. This is the first cartoon since 1964’s False Hare directed by Robert McKimson in his own unit. The cartoons he directed in the DePatie–Freleng era were produced by Friz Freleng’s unit.

Summary
Bunny outlaws Bunny and Claude are chased by the Sheriff as he attempts to disguise himself as a big carrot to catch the duo.

References

External links
  on IMDb

Films scored by William Lava
1968 animated films
1968 short films
1960s Warner Bros. animated short films
American parody films
1968 films
Films directed by Robert McKimson
Looney Tunes shorts
1960s English-language films
1960s American films